Deh-e Now (also Romanized as Deh-i-Nau; also known as Deh-e Now-e Pā’īn) is a village in Baqeran Rural District, in the Central District of Birjand County, South Khorasan Province, Iran. At the 2006 census, its population was 442, in 115 families.

References 

Populated places in Birjand County